Behar Ramadani (born 6 April 1990) is an Albanian football player who plays as a midfielder for Flamurtari Vlorë in Kategoria e Dytë.

Club career

Luftëtari Gjirokastër
In August 2011, Ramadani moved to then Albanian First Division club Luftëtari Gjirokastër. He made his league debut for the club on 10 September 2011 in a 1-0 home victory over KF Vlora. He played all ninety minutes of the match. He scored his first league goal for the club on 25 February 2012 in a 3-0 home victory over KF Himara. His goal, scored in the 66th minute, came just ten minutes after he had been subbed on, replacing Ermir Strati. He picked up a yellow card in the 85th minute.

Vllaznia Shkodër
In August 2013, Ramadani was sold to Albanian Superliga club Vllaznia Shkodër. He made his league debut for the club on 31 August 2013 in a 1-0 home loss to Flamurtari Vlorë. He was subbed off at halftime and was replaced by Arenc Dibra.

Tërbuni Pukë
In January 2014, Ramadani moved again, this time to Albanian First Division club Tërbuni Pukë. He made his league debut for the club on 8 February 2014 in a 3-1 home victory over Elbasani. He played all ninety minutes of the match.

Mamurrasi
In September 2014, he was sold to Mamurrasi in the Albanian First Division. Ramadani made his league debut for the club on 27 September 2014 in a 2-0 away victory over Kastrioti Krujë. He played all ninety minutes of the match. He scored his first league goal for the club on 6 December 2014 in a 1-0 away victory over Besëlidhja Lezhë. His goal came in the 17th minute of the match. Following a yellow card in the 28th minute, Ramadani picked up a second yellow and was subsequently sent off in the 47th minute.

Return to Luftëtari Gjirokastër
In September 2015, Ramadani returned to Luftëtari Gjirokastër. He made his first appearance in the league back with the club on 12 September 2015 in a 2-0 away victory over Dinamo Tirana. He played all ninety minutes of the match.

Honours
Luftëtari
Albanian First Division (2): 2011–12, 2015–16

References

1990 births
Living people
Footballers from Shkodër
Albanian footballers
Association football defenders
Association football midfielders
Albanian expatriate footballers
KS Burreli players
Luftëtari Gjirokastër players
KF Vllaznia Shkodër players
KF Tërbuni Pukë players
KF Adriatiku Mamurrasi players
KF Drenica players
Kategoria Superiore players
Kategoria e Parë players
Football Superleague of Kosovo players
Albanian expatriate sportspeople in Kosovo
Expatriate footballers in Kosovo